Roy Winters (born 13 December 1975) is a former English rugby union player. A lock, Winters last played in the Aviva Championship for Bristol. He began his career playing for Haywards Heath RFC before becoming professional.

Winters was first called up to the senior England squad by Clive Woodward for the 2000 England rugby union tour of South Africa.

Winters had a good 2006-07 Guinness Premiership, coming second in the voting for the PRA Player of the Year and then followed up by being selected for the 2007 England rugby union tour of South Africa. He made his debut for England against South Africa in Bloemfontein on 26 May 2007. He was named captain of Bristol for the 2009-10 RFU Championship.

References

External links
 Bristol Rugby profile
 StatBunker profile
 Scrum.com profile

1975 births
Living people
Bedford Blues players
Bristol Bears players
England international rugby union players
English rugby union players
Harlequin F.C. players
Loughborough Students RUFC players
Rugby union locks
Rugby union players from Cuckfield